Boulger may refer to:

Abraham Boulger (1835–1900), Irish officer, recipient of the Victoria Cross
Demetrius Charles Boulger (1853–1928), British author
E. V. Boulger (1846–1910), Irish academic, Professor of Classics in Adelaide
George Simonds Boulger (1853–1922), English botanist
John Boulger (born 1945), Australian speedway rider

See also
Bulger (disambiguation)
Boulder (disambiguation)